Ensign Ernst Krislanovich Leman (1894–1917) was a Russian World War I flying ace credited with five aerial victories.

Biography
Ernst Krislanovich Leman was born in 1894 to a middle class Lutheran family in Latvia. Leman enlisted as a Private on 14 November 1914. He was sent to Odessa for aviation training. By Spring 1915, he had become a flight cadet. Eventually, he was graduated as a pilot on 29 June 1916; he was rated as a Podpraporshchik. On 29 July 1916, he was posted to the 19th Corps Fighter Detachment near Lutsk.

On 22 August 1916, Leman chased off an enemy plane acting as artillery spotter. His feat was noted in the daily official army communique. It was the start of a series of valorous feats that resulted in the award of the Order of Saint George Fourth Class on 9 January 1917.

Leman's unit then was transferred to the Kingdom of Romania. By late February, it was based near Stanislav, Romania. Though still unsuccessful, he was in frequent combat. In late April he was appointed as a Praporshik. He scored his first victory on 4 May 1917. He was awarded the Order of Saint Anna Fourth Class after his third victory, the Order of Saint Stanilas Third Class with Swords and Bow after his fourth. While scoring his fifth victory on 26 September, he was severely wounded and was hospitalized. He married his nurse, Lydia Vilensky, while convalescing. Kazakov recommended Leman for the Order of Saint George; the Fourth Class award was made on 13 November 1917. On 22 November, Leman was discharged to return to duty, though he was too weak to fly.

On 17 December 1917, Leman was shot in the head. His wife sat by him in hospital until he died several days later.

At the time of Leman's death, it was known that the Soldier's Councils of the Russian Revolution was calling for the murder of military officers. For instance, in the same unit, Ivan Smirnov was marked for murder by the Bolsheviks. It is unknown whether Ernst Leman was murdered or committed suicide.

List of aerial victories
See also Aerial victory standards of World War I, List of World War I flying aces from the Russian Empire

Confirmed victories are numbered and listed chronologically.

Honors and awards
 Cross of St. George, 4th class: January 1917
 Order of St. Anna, 4th class: ca July 1917
 Order of St. Stanislaus, 3rd Class with Swords and Bow: 20 September 1917
 Order of Saint George Fourth Class: 13 November 1917

Endnotes

References

 Allen Durkota; Thomas Darcey; Victor Kulikov. The Imperial Russian Air Service: Famous Pilots and Aircraft and World War I. Flying Machines Press, 1995. , 9780963711021.
 Norman Franks; Russell Guest; Gregory Alegi. Above the War Fronts: The British Two-seater Bomber Pilot and Observer Aces, the British Two-seater Fighter Observer Aces, and the Belgian, Italian, Austro-Hungarian and Russian Fighter Aces, 1914–1918: Volume 4 of Fighting Airmen of WWI Series: Volume 4 of Air Aces of WWI. Grub Street, 1997. , .

External links
 The Aerodrome website page on Leman

Further reading
 Victor Kulikov. Russian Aces of World War 1: Aircraft of the Aces. Osprey Publishing, 2013. , 9781780960616.

1894 births
1917 deaths
Military personnel from Liepāja
People from the Governorate of Livonia
Latvian people of World War I
Russian World War I flying aces
Recipients of the Cross of St. George
Recipients of the Order of St. Anna, 4th class
Russian military personnel killed in World War I